The 2004 WNBA season was the eighth for the Los Angeles Sparks. The Sparks' head coach, Michael Cooper, left the team during the season. Despite with that, the team finished in first place in the West, but they were unable to make another playoff run, losing in the opening round to the Sacramento Monarchs.

Offseason

Dispersal Draft
Based on the Sparks' 2003 record, they would pick 2nd in the Cleveland Rockers dispersal draft. The Sparks picked Isabelle Fijalkowski.

WNBA Draft

Regular season

Season standings

Season schedule

Playoffs

Awards and honors
Lisa Leslie, WNBA Most Valuable Player Award
Lisa Leslie, WNBA Defensive Player of the Year Award
Lisa Leslie, WNBA Peak Performer (rebounds)

Player stats

References

Los Angeles Sparks seasons
Los Angeles
Los Angeles Sparks